The 1968 United States presidential election in Wisconsin was held on November 5, 1968, as part of the 1968 United States presidential election. State voters chose 12 electors to the Electoral College, who voted for president and vice president.

Background
Politics in Wisconsin since the Populist movement had been dominated by the Republican Party, as the upper classes, along with the majority of workers who followed them, fled from William Jennings Bryan’s agrarian and free silver sympathies. Competition between the “League” under Robert M. La Follette, and the conservative “Regular” faction would develop into the Wisconsin Progressive Party in the late 1930s, which was opposed to the conservative German Democrats and to the national Republican Party, and allied with Franklin D. Roosevelt at the federal level. During the two wartime elections, the formerly Democratic German counties in the east of the state – which had been powerfully opposed to the Civil War because they saw it as a “Yankee” war and opposed the military draft instituted during it – viewed Communism as a much greater threat to America than Nazism and consequently opposed President Roosevelt's war effort. Consequently, these historically Democratic counties became virtually the most Republican in the entire state, and became a major support base for populist conservative Senator Joe McCarthy, who became notorious for his investigations into Communists inside the American government.

The 1958 midterm elections, however, saw a major change in Wisconsin politics, as Gaylord A. Nelson became only the state's second Democratic Governor since 1895, and the state also elected Democrats to the position of treasurer and Senator, besides that party gaining a majority in the State Assembly for only the second time since the middle 1890s. They maintained a close balance in the early 1960s, signalling the state's transition to a swing state. Predicted racial backlash from urban Polish-Americans, seen in the 1964 primaries when George Wallace received over 30 percent of Wisconsin's vote, did not affect Lyndon B. Johnson’s big victory in the state in 1964, but would have severe effects when racial unrest began in 1966.

Anti-war Minnesota Senator Eugene McCarthy would easily win Wisconsin’s 1968 Democratic presidential primary against incumbent President Johnson, who soon announced he would not run for re-election in 1968. Former Vice-President and 1960 Republican nominee Richard Nixon won eighty percent of the vote in the state’s Republican primary.

Vote
At the beginning of the campaign, the deep divisions within the Democratic Party were worrisome for political scientists and for the party itself. The first poll said that Nixon was certain to carry Wisconsin, and this opinion was repeated early in October.

Hopes remained dim as the election neared despite the belief by local Representative Clement J. Zablocki that the independent candidacy of George Wallace was losing its impact in the racial-unrest-stricken southern urban counties around Milwaukee, Racine and Kenosha, where Wallace had campaigned extensively in September in his effort to put the election into the House of Representatives. Although the gap would narrow in the last polls, Wisconsin would be carried by Nixon with 47.89 percent of the vote, over Humphrey with 44.27 percent and Wallace with 7.56 percent. Wallace’s fared best in rural northern areas away from Lake Superior, and in southern suburbs affected by racial conflict.

Wisconsin weighed in for this election as 2.92% more Republican than the nation-at-large.

Results

Results by county

See also
 United States presidential elections in Wisconsin

Notes

References

Wisconsin
1968
1968 Wisconsin elections